This is a list of Pittsburgh Penguins award winners.

League awards

Team trophies

Individual awards

All-Stars

NHL first and second team All-Stars
The NHL first and second team All-Stars are the top players at each position as voted on by the Professional Hockey Writers' Association.

NHL All-Rookie Team
The NHL All-Rookie Team consists of the top rookies at each position as voted on by the Professional Hockey Writers' Association.

All-Star Game selections
The National Hockey League All-Star Game is a mid-season exhibition game held annually between many of the top players of each season. Forty-four All-Star Games have been held since the Penguins entered the NHL in 1967, with at least one player chosen to represent the Penguins in each year except 2004. The All-Star Game has not been held in various years: 1979 and 1987 due to the 1979 Challenge Cup and Rendez-vous '87 series between the NHL and the Soviet national team, respectively; 1995, 2005 and 2013 as a result of labor stoppages; 2006, 2010 and 2014 due to the Winter Olympic Games; and 2021 as a result of the COVID-19 pandemic. Pittsburgh has hosted one of the games. The 41st took place at the Civic Arena.

 Selected by fan vote
 Selected by Commissioner
 Selected as one of four "last men in" by fan vote
 All-Star Game Most Valuable Player

All-Star Game replacement events
 Selected by fan vote

Career achievements

Hockey Hall of Fame
The following is a list of Pittsburgh Penguins who have been enshrined in the Hockey Hall of Fame.

Foster Hewitt Memorial Award
One member of the Pittsburgh Penguins organization has been honored with the Foster Hewitt Memorial Award. The award is presented by the Hockey Hall of Fame to members of the radio and television industry who make outstanding contributions to their profession and the game of ice hockey during their broadcasting career.

Lester Patrick Trophy
The Lester Patrick Trophy has been presented by the NHL and USA Hockey since 1966 to honor a recipient's contribution to ice hockey in the United States. This list includes all personnel who have ever been employed by the Pittsburgh Penguins in any capacity and have also received the Lester Patrick Trophy.

United States Hockey Hall of Fame

Retired numbers

The Pittsburgh Penguins have retired two of their jersey numbers. Michel Briere's number 21 was removed from circulation following Briere's death on April 13, 1971, but it was not officially retired until January 5, 2001. Mario Lemieux's number 66 was originally retired on November 19, 1997, after his first retirement. The number was unretired when he began his comeback on December 27, 2000, and re-retired on October 5, 2006, after Lemieux announced his second retirement during the previous season. Also out of circulation is the number 99 which was retired League-wide for Wayne Gretzky on February 6, 2000. Gretzky did not play for the Penguins during his 20-year NHL career and no Penguins player had ever worn the number 99 prior to its retirement. Lemieux himself confirmed that Jaromir Jagr's #68 will be retired in the future.

Team awards

Penguins' Ring of Honor
A mural honoring members of the franchise's "Millennium Team", it was first displayed September 26, 2003. This was a permanent display at Mellon Arena until its demolition, designed to honor past greats without having to retire their numbers. Current members are:

 Tom Barrasso (G)
 Les Binkley (G)
 Herb Brooks (Coach)
 Dave Burrows (D)
 Paul Coffey (D)
 Ron Francis (F)
 Jaromir Jagr (F)
 Bob Johnson (Coach)
 Rick Kehoe (F)
 Mario Lemieux (F)
 Larry Murphy (D)
 Craig Patrick (GM-coach)
 Jean Pronovost (F)
 Ulf Samuelsson (D)
 Kevin Stevens (F)
 Mark Recchi (F)

Penguins Hall of Fame

 Bob Johnson, head coach (1990–1991) inducted 1992
 Jean Pronovost, RW (1968–1978) inducted 1992
 Rick Kehoe, RW (1974–1985) inducted 1992
 Syl Apps, Jr., C (1970–1978) inducted 1994
 Edward J. DeBartolo Sr., owner (1977–1991) inducted 1996
 Dave Burrows, D (1971–1978, 1980–1982) inducted 1996
 Elaine Heufelder, front office (1967–2003) inducted 1996
 Mario Lemieux, C (1984–1997, 2000–2006), owner (1999–present) inducted 1999
 Jack Riley, GM (1967–1970, 1972–1974) inducted 1999
 Joe Mullen, RW (1990–1995, 1996–1997) inducted 2000
 Craig Patrick, GM (1989–2006) inducted 2001
 Mike Lange, broadcaster (1974–1975, 1976–present) inducted 2001
 Anthony "A.T." Caggiano, locker room (1967–2000) inducted 2001
 Les Binkley, G (1967–1972) inducted 2003
 Ulf Samuelsson, D (1991–1995) inducted 2003
 Vince Lascheid, organist (1970–2003) inducted 2003
 Paul Coffey, D (1987–1992) inducted 2007
 Frank Sciulli, locker room (1967–2007) inducted 2007

Michel Briere Memorial Rookie of the Year Trophy

The Michel Briere Memorial Rookie of the Year Trophy is an annual award given to the player who was the most proficient player on the team in his first year of competition in the league. It is named in memory of Michel Briere, who died in a car accident at the end of the 1969–70 NHL season. Briere himself won the award that season, when it was known as the Rookie of the Year Award. There were no winners of the award for several seasons because the team did not have any rookies who could satisfy the conditions to win the award.

Most Valuable Player Award
The Most Valuable Player Award is an annual award given to the player or players deemed most valuable to the team. The first winner, following the Penguins first season in the League in 1968, was goaltender Les Binkley. Mario Lemieux was voted team MVP 12 times, between 1985 and 2003. Sidney Crosby has won the award five times and Jaromir Jagr has won the award four times. Jean Pronovost and Evgeni Malkin have each won the award three times, while Dave Burrows, Ron Schock and Ron Francis have each won twice.

The MVP has most frequently been a center, who have been selected 28 times. Eleven wingers have been selected, ten of them right wings. A defenseman was selected six times. Three different goaltenders have also been selected.

Players' Player Award
The Players' Player Award is an annual award voted on by the players and given to the player who "exemplifies leadership for the team both on and off of the ice, and who is dedicated to teamwork."

The Edward J. DeBartolo Community Service Award
The Edward J. DeBartolo Community Service Award is an annual award given to the player(s) who have donated a considerable amount of time during the season to working on community and charity projects. It is named in memory of former Penguins owner Edward J. DeBartolo, who owned the team from 1978 to 1991.

Defunct team awards

A. T. Caggiano Memorial Booster Club Award
The A. T. Caggiano Memorial Booster Club Award was an annual award given to the player who earned the most votes from Star of the game selections throughout the regular season as voted by Penguins Booster Club members. It was named in memory of longtime Penguins locker room attendant Anthony "A. T." Caggiano.

Aldege "Baz" Bastien Memorial Good Guy Award

The Aldege "Baz" Bastien Memorial Good Guy Award was an annual award given to the player selected by the Pittsburgh chapter of the Professional Hockey Writers Association for his cooperation with the local media. It was named in memory of former Penguins general manager and former player and coach of the AHL's Pittsburgh Hornets, Aldege "Baz" Bastien. The award debuted at the end of the 1983–84 NHL season.

From 1992 to 1996, Molson Breweries sponsored the award, and Disaster Specialists sponsored from 1997 to 1999.

Bob Johnson Memorial Badger Bob Award
The Bob Johnson Memorial Badger Bob Award was an annual award given to the player who, "through his performance on the ice, his character and total dedication to his teammates for the success of the team, shows that every day is "A Great Day For Hockey."" It was named in memory of "Badger Bob" Johnson, who was the team's head coach during the 1990–91 season. It was last awarded in 2002.

Defensive Player of the Year
The Defensive Player of the Year was an annual award given to honor "the defensive skills of an individual player on the team."

Other awards

See also
List of National Hockey League awards

Notes

References

Pittsburgh Penguins
awards